A small number of vessels have born the name Indian Trader:

  made one voyage for the British East India Company (EIC). She was on her second voyage for the EIC when a French privateer captured her. The British recaptured her and she returned to merchant service, sailing to the Americas. She was lost c.1830.
 was launched in 1819 at Howrah and wrecked in 1822 on the west coast of Sumatra.

Ship names